Pojorâta is a commune located in the western part of Suceava County, in the historical region of Bukovina, northeastern Romania. With a surface area of 13,770 hectares, it comprises the villages of Pojorâta—as its chief commune—and Valea Putnei.

Late modern period history 

As it is the case of other former mining rural settlements from the countryside of Suceava County, Pojorâta was previously inhabited by a sizable German community, more specifically by Zipser Germans (part of the larger Bukovina German community) during the late Modern Age up until the mid 20th century, starting as early as the Habsburg period and, later on, the Austro-Hungarian period.

Administration and local politics

Communal council 

The commune's current local council has the following political composition, according to the results of the 2020 Romanian local elections:

Gallery

References

Further reading

External links 

 
  

1696 establishments in the Ottoman Empire
Communes in Suceava County
Localities in Southern Bukovina
Mining communities in Romania
Populated places established in 1696